Pekka Juhani Pöyry (10 December 1939 in Helsinki – 4 August 1980 in Helsinki) was a Finnish jazz and rock saxophonist and flutist. He was part of the Pekka Pöyry Quartet and Quintet.

Early life 
Pöyry became interested in jazz music at school and began studying the violin and clarinet. He was, however, more taken with playing the alto saxophone, inspired by Charlie Parker. In addition, he played the flute and soprano saxophone.

Career 
After graduating with a Master of Laws in 1966, Pöyry decided to become a professional musician. In the same year he represented YLE, EBU's concert in London. The mid-1960s, he had his own quartet with pianist Eero Ojanen, bassist Teppo Hauta-aho and drummer Reino Laine. They performed at the 1966 Pori Jazz Festival and were joined by the Norwegian-Finnish singer Pia Skaar to form a quintet. In May 1967, the quintet appeared at the Tallinn Jazz Festival. In a 1969 interview, Bill Evans described the quartet's performance (although couldn't remember the name) at the 1969 Montreux Jazz Festival, where they won as "marvelous" and "highly professional". He increasingly became interested in progressive rock and jazz fusion in the late 1960s and 1970s. With his later groups he attempted international breakthrough, including the Reading Festival in England in 1973. His band, Tasavallan Presidentti, however, broke up in 1974. He also played with Wigwam.

In 1975, Pöyry toured northern Europe with the North Jazz Quintet, and later he joined the orchestra of Heikki Sarmanto, later the UMO Jazz Orchestra, playing the Ljubljana Festival in what was then Yugoslavia in 1976. He also performed in Poland, Czechoslovakia, Cuba, the Soviet Union, Britain and the United States with other bands.

Personal life 
A manic depressive, Pöyry committed suicide in 1980. The Pekka Pöyry Award is named in his honor and given to young, talented saxophonists in Finland, awarded since the early-1980s.

References

1939 births
1980 deaths
Finnish jazz saxophonists
Male saxophonists
Finnish jazz musicians
Musicians from Helsinki
Jazz flautists
Jazz alto saxophonists
Suicides by hanging in Finland
1980 suicides
Finnish flautists
20th-century saxophonists
20th-century male musicians
Male jazz musicians
20th-century flautists